Nawab Sir Muhammad Ali Beg,  (1852–1930) was an Indian military leader from Hyderabad State, serving there and in the British Indian Army.

Life

He was born Aurangabad (Deccan) in 1852 He was the son of the late Mirza Vilayet Ali Beg, Ressaldar of the 3rd Lancers, Hyderabad Contingent. From 1897 he commanded the Nizam's regular forces, and from 1884 he was aide-de-camp to the Nizam of Hyderabad, in the Ressaldar Hyderabad Contingent. He was Commander of the Golconda Brigade since 1885, in the Hyderabad Imperial Service Troops since 1893, and Commander of Regular Troops since 1897, Jagirdar, Hyderabad State.

Career 

 Commander of the 1st and 2nd Lancers, Hyderabad Imperial Service Troops
 Hon. Colonel 20th Deccan Horse 
 1879-80 - Afghan War, 1879–1880, medal and clasp
 1888 - Black Mountain Expedition, medal and clasp. Mentioned in dispatches.
 1900 - China Expedition, (medal).  Sir Afsar was on staff of Count Von Waldersee during the Boxer Rebellion in 1901.
 1902 - A.D.C for the Nizam, Sir Afsur represented Hyderabad at the coronation of King Edward VII.
 1911 - A.D.C to Lord Hardinge, Viceroy of India
 1915 - Staff of Imperial Service Cavalry Brigade, Indian Expeditionary Force, Egypt, 1915
 1915-16 - Staff Indian Cavalry Corp and A.D.C to Sir John French
 1917 - Commander-In-Chief, His Exalted Highness the Nizam's Regular Forces

Titles 

 1884 - Received title of Khan Bahadur and Afsur Jung
 1888 - Appointed Honorary Major

 1895 - Received title of Afsur Dowla
 1897 - Decorated with C.I.E. on 22 June 1897 in the Jubilee Honours' Gazette

 1902 - Appointed Honorary Lieutenant-Colonel

 1903 - Received title of Afur-ul-Mulk after Delhi Durbar
 1906 - Member of the Royal Victorian Order (M.V.O)

 1908 - Decorated with K.C.I.E

Notes 

1852 births
1930 deaths
Knights Commander of the Order of the Indian Empire
Indian knights
Indian Members of the Royal Victorian Order
People from Hyderabad State
British military personnel of the Hazara Expedition of 1888